Greasy may refer to:

 Greasy, Oklahoma, United States, a census-designated place
 Greasy Creek (disambiguation), various streams in the United States
 Greasy Neale (1891–1973), American football coach
 Greasy Sae, a character in the novel The Hunger Games
 Greasy, a character in the film Who Framed Roger Rabbit

See also
 Cressida cressida, a swallowtail butterfly species also called the "big greasy"
 Acraea andromacha, a butterfly species also known as the "little greasy"
 Grease (disambiguation)
 Greaser (disambiguation)
 Greece